The Harvard Crimson men's volleyball team represents Harvard University in National Collegiate Athletic Association (NCAA) Division I men's volleyball. Harvard competes as a member of the Eastern Intercollegiate Volleyball Association and plays its home games at the Malkin Athletic Center (MAC) in Cambridge, Massachusetts.

History
Harvard's first team took the court in 1981. During the team's most successful season to date, The Crimson was ranked No. 15 in the US by the American Volleyball Coaches Association (AVCA) on April 9, 2012. This marked the first time in program history that The Crimson was recognized in the national poll. 2018, the program won its first ever EIVA title as well as made its first appearance in the NCAA tournament.

Players

Current roster

See also
 Harvard Crimson women's volleyball
 Harvard Crimson

References

External links
 

 
1981 establishments in Massachusetts